Scuderia Centro Sud was a privateer racing team founded in Modena by Guglielmo "Mimmo" Dei and active in Formula One and sports car racing between 1956 and 1965.

Dei had been an amateur driver in the 1930s. In the early 1950s he opened a Maserati dealership in Rome. Keen on maintaining a relationship with motorsport, in 1956 he founded his own team. The name "Centro Sud" refers to the parts of Italy where his adoptive and native cities are (Modena and Rome).

Over the course of nine seasons, Scuderia Centro Sud entered a total of 49 World Championship rounds, with cars such as the Maserati 250F, various Maserati-powered Coopers and, in the 1960s, a BRM P57. After a very promising start (they scored their first points at their debut with Luigi Villoresi), Centro Sud went on to earn a further total of 24 points, mostly with Masten Gregory and Tony Maggs. But they never won a race: Gregory's third place at the 1957 Monaco Grand Prix was the team's best result.

Centro Sud was the only Italian racing team that took part in the Tasman races in Australia and New Zealand during the winter of 1961-1962.

One of their most notable feats was to be the first team in the history of Formula One to run a female driver, when Maria Teresa de Filippis (who had already raced as a privateer in the 1958 Belgian Grand Prix a few weeks earlier) competed in the 1958 Portuguese Grand Prix as a Centro Sud team driver. Future 1963 24 Hours of Le Mans) and 1967 24 Hours of Daytona winner Lorenzo Bandini made his Formula One debut with the team at the 1961 Belgian Grand Prix.

Complete Formula One World Championship results
(key)

* After retiring his Scuderia Centro Sud-entered car, Shelby subsequently took over Masten Gregory's car, entered by Temple Buell, finishing fourth.

References 

Italy's Maserati privateer

Bibliography 
Mimmo Dei, Dei ex Machina: La storia della Scuderia Centro-Sud, Milan, Fucina Editore, 2008. (IT)

Formula One entrants
Italian auto racing teams